Acer davidii, or Père David's maple, is a species of maple in the snakebark maple group. It is native to China, from Jiangsu south to Fujian and Guangdong, and west to southeastern Gansu and Yunnan.

The tree was originally discovered by a Chinese person lost to history but a French priest Armand David who was in Central China as a missionary took the credit. It was re-discovered by Charles Maries during his visit to Jiangsu in 1878.

It is a small deciduous tree growing to 10–15 m tall with a trunk up to 40 cm in diameter, though usually smaller and often with multiple trunks, and a spreading crown of long, arching branches. The bark is smooth, olive-green with regular narrow pale vertical stripes on young trees, eventually becoming dull grey-brown at the base of old trees. The leaves are 6–18 cm long and 4–9 cm broad, with a petiole 3–6 cm long; they are dark green above, paler below, ovate, unlobed or weakly three-lobed, with a serrated margin. They turn to bright yellow, orange or red in the autumn. The flowers are small, yellow, with five sepals and petals about 4 mm long; they are produced on arching to pendulous 7–12 cm racemes in late spring, with male and female flowers on different racemes. The samara nutlets are 7–10 mm long and 4–6 mm broad, with a wing 2–3 cm long and 5 mm broad.

Subspecies and cultivars
There are two subspecies, often treated as a distinct species:
Acer davidii subsp. davidii. Père David's maple. Bark greenish-brown with white stripes. Shoots pinkish-green. Leaf petiole pink to red; leaf margin usually single-serrate with variably-sized serrations.
Acer davidii subsp. grosseri (Pax) de Jong. Hers's maple (Acer grosseri Pax; syn. Acer hersii Rehd.) - bark green with white to pale green stripes. Shoots green. Leaf petiole green; leaf margin more often three-lobed and double-serrate.

Along with A. rufinerve, the two subspecies of Père David's maple are among the most commonly cultivated snakebark maples.  Both are relatively hardy and fast-growing.

Among the cultivars of A. davidii are:-
'Canton' (a Dutch cultivar with a purplish hue to its green stripes)
'George Forrest' (a Scottish cultivar with large leaves and dark red young shoots - this cultivar has gained the Royal Horticultural Society's Award of Garden Merit) 
'Ernest Wilson' (a specimen of which may be viewed in the Westonbirt Arboretum in England)
'Serpentine' (a cultivar with distinctively small, narrow leaves)

In some cases, these cultivars cannot be assigned to one subspecies or the other but are simply considered cultivars of A. davidii.

Gallery

References

davidii
Trees of China
Endemic flora of China
Plants described in 1885